Encarsia inaron is a parasitoid wasp used in the control of ash whitefly, Siphoninus phillyreae. The ash whitefly is an insect from Europe that feeds on the sap of plants, and which has become a pest in North America. E. inaron was acquired from Italy and Israel and brought to California in 1989.

Appearance 
Unlike like most wasps, they do not have a stinger. Males and females can be distinguished based on their body color patterns. Both adult males and females possess black head and eyes and clear wings, but females display a yellow abdomen while males display a black one.

Habitat
These wasps are mostly found in woody shrubs and trees.

Life cycle 
An adult E. inaron deposits its eggs on the ash whitefly, where it develops inside. Inside the abdomen of the ash whitefly, the larvae begins to grow and have a sickle-shape. Before the end of development, the adult E inaron bursts out of the ash whitefly, thereby killing it. Maturation takes roughly three weeks.

Usefulness
Prior to the introduction of E.inaron in California, ash whitefly infestation was pervasive. Ash, pear, and ornamental trees were naked, for leaves have fallen to the ground. Beginning in 1989 when the parasitoid wasps were established, ash whitefly population declined significantly. Within two years, ash whiteflies were virtually eliminated. As a result, it saved cities money from being spent on managing ash whitefly infestation.

References 

Aphelinidae
Biological pest control wasps
Insects used as insect pest control agents
Insects described in 1839